Santiago Simón (born 13 June 2002) is an Argentine professional footballer who plays as a winger for River Plate.

Club career
Simón started playing football at the age of four at Cooperativa Tortuguitas. He joined River Plate's academy in 2013, following a week-long trial. He spent seven years in their system, notably moving into the reserve squad in February 2020; debuting versus Banfield on 14 February. Nine months later, on 20 November, Simón was promoted into Marcelo Gallardo's senior squad for a Copa de la Liga Profesional match with the aforementioned Banfield. His debut subsequently arrived, with the winger replacing Cristian Ferreira for the final seventeen minutes of a 2–0 away win.

International career
Simón represented Argentina at U17 level. After featuring in an October 2018 friendly against their United States counterparts, Simón was selected by Pablo Aimar for the 2019 South American U-17 Championship, which they won, and the subsequent 2019 FIFA U-17 World Cup; appearing a total of five times across both competitions.

Career statistics
.

Honours
Argentina U17
South American U-17 Championship: 2019

Notes

References

External links

2002 births
Living people
People from José C. Paz Partido
Argentine footballers
Argentina youth international footballers
Association football midfielders
Club Atlético River Plate footballers
Sportspeople from Buenos Aires Province